Tommy February6 is the debut album of the Brilliant Green vocalist Tomoko Kawase's alter ego Tommy February6 (so named after Kawase's birthday). The album, in addition to launching Kawase's solo career, also established Tommy February6's trademark sound, which is heavily influenced by 80's synthpop music.

Most of the lyrics on the album's original material (all written by Kawase) are either dominated by English lyrics with occasional Japanese lines, or are wholly in English – despite the fact that Kawase reportedly cannot speak much of the language – with only one song ("Tommy Feb Latte, Macaron.") sung entirely in Japanese.

The original first pressing of the album came with a promotional DVD that included music videos, karaoke videos and furitsuke (choreography) videos for "Kiss One More Time" and "Bloomin'!". Also included was the making of the PV's for "Kiss One More Time", "Bloomin'!" and "Candy Pop in Love"

Track listing

Personnel
Tommy February6 – lead and backing vocals
 Malibu Convertible – keyboards, guitar, drum programming, arrangements
Team Real Men – backing vocals (tracks: 3, 10)

Production
Tommy February6 – executive producer
Malibu Convertible – producer, arranger, recording engineer, mixing engineer
Auspicious Feather – recording engineer, mixing engineer (tracks: 2, 8)
Dark Undercover – assistant engineer (tracks: 2, 8)

References 

2002 debut albums
Defstar Records albums
Tomoko Kawase albums